Tomorrow Today is a studio album by Al Jarreau issued in 2000 by GRP Records. The album rose to No. 2 on the Billboard Jazz Albums chart.

Overview
Artists such as Boney James and Vanessa Williams are featured.

Jarreau covered The Crusaders 
Puddit (Put It Where You Want It) upon the album.

Singles
"It's How You Say It" rose to No. 14 on the Billboard Adult R&B Songs chart.

Track listing

Personnel 
 Lead vocals – Al Jarreau (all tracks), Vanessa Williams (track 9)
 Keyboards – Phil Davis, Barry J. Eastmond, Tim Heintz, Jerry Hey, Randy Kerber, Greg Mathieson, Freddie Ravel, Dan Shea, John Stoddart and Larry Williams
 Guitars – Ross Bolton, Phil Hamilton, Paul Jackson Jr., Michael Landau and Tony Maiden
 Bass – Alex Al, Jimmy Johnson and Chris Walker
 Drums – Steve Gadd
 Percussion – Luis Conte and Paulinho da Costa
 Harmonica – Tollak Ollestad
 Saxophones – Larry Williams, Boney James (solo on track 2)
 Trombone – Bill Reichenbach Jr.
 Trumpet – Gary Grant, Jerry Hey, Rick Braun (solo on track 7)
 Backing vocals – Sarah Brown,  Reggie Burrell, Sue Ann Carwell, Bill Champlin, Josephine James, Ryan Jarreau, Susan Jarreau, Kevyn Lettau, Mindy Stein, Donna Taylor and Phyllis Yvonne Williams

Production 
 Paul Brown – producer (Tracks 1-9 & 11)
 Barry J. Eastmond – producer (Track 10)
 Bill Darlington – executive producer 
 Bill Schnee – engineer, mixing 
 Koji Egawa – assistant engineer
 Stephen Marcussen – mastering at A&M Mastering Studios (Hollywood, California).
 Hollis King – art direction, design 
 Albert Sanchez – photography

References

Al Jarreau albums
2000 albums
GRP Records albums